was a Japanese illustrator. He is famous for illustrating the international version of The Empire Strikes Back poster and several Godzilla film posters during the political Heisei period.

His son, Ohrai Taro is also an artist in Japan.

Personal life 
Noriyoshi Ohrai was born in Akashi, Hyogo prefecture, Japan in 1935. After studying at (but not graduating from) the Art department of Tokyo University of the Arts, he began to work as an illustrator since 1962. In 1973 he moved to Miyazaki-city, Miyazaki prefecture where his wife came from.

In 1980, his image illustration of Star Wars which he posted to a science fiction magazine caught the eye of George Lucas.
At Lucas' request, Ohrai illustrated the poster that was used internationally for Star Wars: The Empire Strikes Back, which made him famous internationally. In 2014 and 2015, he had exhibitions of his works in Miyazaki. On October 27, 2015, he died at the age of 79 from pneumonia.

Works

Illustrations for films 
 The Empire Strikes Back （1980） – poster for the international version
 Future War 198X （1982） – image illustration
 The Beastmaster （1982） – poster
 The Goonies（1985） – poster
 Godzilla – poster
 The Return of Godzilla （1984）
 Godzilla vs. Biollante （1989）
 Godzilla vs. King Ghidorah （1991）
 Godzilla vs. Mothra （1992）
 Godzilla vs. Mechagodzilla II （1993）
 Godzilla vs. SpaceGodzilla （1994）
 Godzilla vs. Destoroyah （1995）
 Godzilla vs. Megaguirus （2000）
 Godzilla: Final Wars （2004）
 Japan Sinks （2006） – poster

Illustrations for novels 
 Wolf Guy series（Kazumasa Hirai）
 ウルフガイ（全2巻、1971年 – 1972年、早川書房） – カバー / 口絵 / 挿画
 狼の紋章／狼の怨歌（1973年、早川書房） – カバー
 ウルフガイ・シリーズ（全4巻、1975年、祥伝社） – カバー / 挿画
 ウルフガイシリーズ（全8巻、1985年 – 1986年、徳間書店） – カバー / 挿画
 アダルト・ウルフガイシリーズ（平井和正）
 ウルフガイ 別巻（全4巻、1972年 – 1974年、早川書房） – カバー / 口絵 / 挿画
 アダルト・ウルフガイ・シリーズ（全9巻、1974年 – 1979年、祥伝社） – カバー / 挿画
 Zombie Hunter series（Kazumasa Hirai）
 ゾンビー・ハンター（全1巻、1972年、早川書房） – カバー / 口絵 / 挿画
 死霊狩り（全3巻、1975年 – 1978年、角川書店） – カバー
 Genma Taisen series（Kazumasa Hirai）
 幻魔大戦（全20巻、1979年 – 1983年、角川書店） – カバー / 挿画
 幻魔大戦（全7巻、1987年、徳間書店） – 挿画
 角川文庫　Sakyo Komatsu's novels –　カバー
 ヴァンパイヤー戦争シリーズ（笠井潔） – カバー
 日本武尊SF神話シリーズ（豊田有恒） – カバー
 Lensman series（E. E. Smith）
 レンズマン・シリーズ（translated by Takumi Shibano、全7巻、2002年 – 2004年、創元SF文庫） – 装画
 The Dumarest saga（Edwin Charles Tubb） – カバー / 挿画

Illustrations for games 
 蒼Aoki Ōkami to Shiroki Mejika series（Koei） – パッケージイラスト
 Genghis Khan (video game)（1987）
 Genghis Khan II: Clan of the Gray Wolf（1992）
 Nobunaga's Ambition series（コーエー） – パッケージイラスト
 信長の野望・戦国群雄伝（1988）
 信長の野望・武将風雲録（1990）
 信長の野望・覇王伝（1992）
 信長の野望・天翔記（1994）
 Romance of the Three Kingdoms (video game series)（コーエー） – パッケージイラスト
 Romance of the Three Kingdoms II（1989）
 Romance of the Three Kingdoms III: Dragon of Destiny（1992）
 Romance of the Three Kingdoms IV: Wall of Fire（1994）
 Pacific Theater of Operations series （コーエー） – パッケージイラスト
 P.T.O.（1989）
 P.T.O. II（1993）
 P.T.O. III（1996）
 Uncharted Waters series（コーエー） – パッケージイラスト
 Uncharted Waters（1990）
 Uncharted Waters II（1993）
 Taikō Risshiden series（コーエー） – パッケージイラスト
 Taikou Risshiden V（1992）
 Taikō Risshiden II（1995）
 維新の嵐（1988、コーエー） – パッケージイラスト
 Bandit Kings of Ancient China（1989、コーエー） – パッケージイラスト
 L'Empereur（1990、コーエー） – パッケージイラスト
 Gemfire（1991、コーエー） – パッケージイラスト
 Rise of the Phoenix（1993、コーエー） – パッケージイラスト
 Liberty or Death (video game)（1993、コーエー） – パッケージイラスト
 源平合戦（1994、コーエー） – パッケージイラスト
 プロジェネター（1994、コーエー） – パッケージイラスト
 モン★スタートラベラー（2002、タイトー） – パッケージイラスト
 Metal Gear Solid series
 Metal Gear Solid 2: Sons of Liberty - Premium Package booklet illustration
 Metal Gear Solid: The Twin Snakes - Premium Package booklet illustration
 Metal Gear Solid 3: Snake Eater - Premium Package booklet illustration
 Metal Gear Solid: Portable Ops - Premium Package inner illustration

Art collection books 
 生賴範義イラストレーション（1980年、徳間書店） 
 生頼範義198X年イラスト集（1982年、講談社） 
 生賴範義イラストレーション2 《幻魔世界》（1983年、徳間書店） 
 神話-THE BEAUTIES IN MYTHS（1988年、徳間書店） 
 生賴範義 THE ILLUSTRATOR（2014年、宮崎文化本舗） 
 生賴範義 緑色の宇宙（2014年、玄光社） 
 生賴範義II 記憶の回廊 1966–1984（2015年、宮崎文化本舗）

References 
Notes

References

External links 
 スター・ウォーズ 帝国の逆襲・チラシ – ぴあ
 日本沈没 (2006)・チラシ – ぴあ
 Noriyoshi Ohrai Exhibition page – English version

1935 births
2015 deaths
Film poster artists
Artists from Hyōgo Prefecture
Deaths from pneumonia in Japan
Japanese illustrators
Japanese speculative fiction artists
People from Akashi, Hyōgo